Geoffrey Phillips is an Australian television news presenter. He is best known for presenting the New South Wales and Australian Capital Territory editions of WIN News on WIN Television, from the network's headquarters in Wollongong.

In 2017, Phillips celebrated 29 years with WIN Television with WIN Corporation. A year later, he celebrated his 30th anniversary of working for WIN Television.

In 2016, ABC Television's Media Watch program showed Phillips in an on-screen graphic to illustrate the lack of on-screen diversity on Australia's news bulletins, with the program showing Phillips as being one of four white Australian news presenters who read news for Canberra.

In 2009, Phillips was diagnosed with prostate cancer and in 2017, he became the patron of the Cancer Council's Relay for Life event in Wollongong. He also has coeliac disease.

See also
Amy Duggan

References

External links
WIN News tribute: Geoff Phillips' 30 Years at WIN

Year of birth missing (living people)
Living people
WIN News presenters